Karen Akopovich Akopyan (born 18 January 1992) is a former Russian professional football player of Armenian descent.

Club career
He made his Russian Football National League debut for FC Luch-Energiya Vladivostok on 29 April 2010 in a game against FC Irtysh Omsk.

External links
 
 Career summary at sportbox.ru

1992 births
Sportspeople from Vladivostok
Living people
Ethnic Armenian sportspeople
Russian footballers
FC Dynamo Moscow reserves players
FC Luch Vladivostok players
Russian people of Armenian descent
FC Lada-Tolyatti players
FC Shirak players
Russian expatriate footballers
Expatriate footballers in Armenia
Association football midfielders
FC Smena Komsomolsk-na-Amure players